Events in the year 1783 in Norway.

Incumbents
Monarch: Christian VII

Events

Arts and literature

Births
23 December - Lorentz Lange, judge and politician (d.1860)

Full date unknown
Christian Holm, politician (d.1855)
Andreas Samuelsen Vibstad, politician (d.1854)

Deaths
Simen Fougner, farmer and writer (born 1701).

See also

References